Talis Group Ltd. is a software company based in Birmingham, England that develops software for higher education. They were previously involved in development of library management software and a Semantic Web application platform. In 2005 Talis was voted one of the top ICT Employers in the United Kingdom.

History 

In 1969 a number of libraries founded a small co-operative project, based in Birmingham, to provide services that would help the libraries become more efficient. The project was known as the Birmingham Libraries Co-operative Mechanisation Project, or BLCMP, and included the library of the University of Birmingham. At this time the concept of library automation was so new that the term mechanisation was often used in its place.

BLCMP began a co-operative catalogue of bibliographic data at the start of its work, a database that now contains many millions of records. For this an adaptation of UKMARC coding was used. This shared approach to creating metadata is the forefather of later, Internet-based, community ventures such as IMDb, Freebase and others. But this was back in 1969 when shipping this data around involved printing cards and putting boxes on trucks. More libraries became members of BLCMP, e.g. many of the academic libraries of Manchester and Salford.

BLCMP moved into using microfiche and later IBM mainframes with dedicated terminals at libraries in the mid-seventies and was one of the first library automation vendors to provide a GUI on top of Microsoft Windows to provide a better interface for end-users. The integrated library system (ILS) was first called Talis after 'The Automated Library And Information System'.  Talis became the name of the company during re-structuring and the ILS became known as Alto. In 1995 Talis was the first library systems vendor to produce a web-enabled public access catalogue. The library of the University of Sheffield became the 50th customer to choose the Talis library system  in 1996.

During the first decade of the 3rd millennium, much of Talis's work focused on the transition of information to the web, specifically the Semantic Web, and Talis has led much of the debate about how Web 2.0 attitudes affect traditional libraries. Alongside semantic web developments Talis launched Talis Education Ltd, a business focused on products in Higher Education learning, and Kasabi, a data marketplace.

In March 2011 Talis sold its library management division to Capita Group.  The division was sold for a reported £18.5 million plus a further £2.5 million depending on the company's profitability in the following financial year. The company moved its headquarters from Solihull to central Birmingham.

Following the sale of its library management business Talis experimented with a semantic web and data marketplace business alongside the rapidly establishing education business. A tough economic climate required Talis to focus its investment, therefore they announced in July 2012 that investment in the semantic web and data marketplace areas would cease. All efforts are now concentrated on the education business.

Talis Aspire, the company's enterprise teaching and learning platform, is now in use by over 1 million students at 93 universities across 8 countries, including over 65% of all UK universities.

Talis was acquired by SAGE Publications in 2018.

See also
 Copac
 Library 2.0
 SUNCAT

References

Further reading
 Stubley, P. (1988). BLCMP: a guide for librarians and systems managers. Aldershot, Hants, England: Gower. 
 Birmingham; Buckle, David, & BLCMP. (1974). Birmingham libraries co-operative mechanisation project: research and development programme, January 1969 to March 1975 : a background paper.
 Birmingham Libraries Co-operative Mechanisation Project, & Buckle, D. G. R. (1976). Birmingham Libraries Co-operative Mechanisation Project final report. Birmingham: BLCMP. (David Buckle became the first manager of BLCMP.)

External links
 Talis Group Ltd.—company homepage

Companies based in Birmingham, West Midlands
Semantic Web companies
Software companies of the United Kingdom
Library automation
Library cataloging and classification
Library-related organizations
Software companies established in 1969
1969 establishments in England
Employee-owned companies of the United Kingdom
British companies established in 1969
Science and technology in the West Midlands (county)